Károly Antal (23 June 1909 – 26 May 1994, in Budapest) was a twentieth century Hungarian sculptor. His sculptural style reflected neoclassicism style.

Antal studied at the Academy of Fine Arts with István Szentgyörgyi between 1928 and 1937. He received a state scholarship in Rome in 1934–35 and he exhibited several times in Italy.

His early sculptures were characterized by the neoclassicist style of the Roman School. His sculptures "St Gellért" and "Frater Julianus" were erected at the Fishermen's Bastion in Budapest in 1937, and at the Coronation of St Stephen in Esztergom in 1938. After 1945 he created several memorials.

In 1962 he made the sculptural decoration on the facade of the Cathedral of Pécs.

External links
Károly Antal profile

1909 births
1982 deaths
20th-century Hungarian sculptors